Coenomyia is a genus of flies in the family Xylophagidae.

Species
Coenomyia basalis Matsumura, 1915
Coenomyia bituberculata Enderlein, 1921
Coenomyia ferruginea (Scopoli, 1763)
Coenomyia maculata Yang & Nagatomi, 1994

References

Xylophagidae
Brachycera genera
Taxa named by Pierre André Latreille
Diptera of Asia
Diptera of Europe